Ruben Knab (born 19 February 1988) is a Dutch representative two-time Olympian rower. He finished fifth in the coxless four at the 2012 Summer Olympics and again finished fifth and at Tokyo 2020 in Dutch heavyweight men's eight.

He won a medal at the 2019 World Rowing Championships. At Tokyo 2020 the Dutch men's eight won their heat, then finished 5th in the A final for an overall fifth placing at the Olympic regatta.

References

External links

1988 births
Living people
Dutch male rowers
Rowers at the 2012 Summer Olympics
Rowers at the 2020 Summer Olympics
Olympic rowers of the Netherlands
People from Ede, Netherlands
Sportspeople from Gelderland
World Rowing Championships medalists for the Netherlands
20th-century Dutch people
21st-century Dutch people